Rana Iqbal Ahmad Khan (Urdu/) is a Pakistani lawyer and former politician who previously served as a provincial cabinet minister in the Punjab government. A veteran member of the Pakistan Peoples Party (PPP), he began his legal career in the mid-1960s and also entered politics at around the same time. He is a practicing advocate in the Supreme Court and a member of the District Bar Association of Gujranwala. More recently, he has been associated with Tahir-ul-Qadri and his Pakistan Awami Tehreek movement.

Background
Khan was born in the village of Talwandi in the Patiala State (now in eastern Punjab), in pre-partition British India. He belongs to a Rajput family and his father Rana Khurshid Ahmad Khan was a zamindar (landlord). Following the partition of India in 1947, his family migrated to Pakistan and settled in the village of Sanhara Geraya in Gujranwala District, Punjab. He is a resident of Satellite Town, Gujranwala.

Education
Khan matriculated from the Government High School in Gujranwala in 1957, following which he studied at the Islamia College in Lahore, graduating in 1961. He later pursued a Master of Arts degree in Persian at the Punjab University in 1963, and completed a Bachelor of Laws at the same university in 1965.

Legal and political career
Khan began his legal practice in 1965 at the District Court of Gujranwala. In 1968, he became an advocate in the Lahore High Court. He entered politics at a young age as one of the grassroots members of the Pakistan Peoples Party (PPP), establishing a working relationship with Zulfiqar Ali Bhutto and playing a key role in organising the party's early democratic movement. During his political career, Khan served as a chairman of the Pakistan Peoples Party in Gujranwala District and also chaired the Gujranwala Kissan Committee (farmers' committee). He also contested in elections on behalf of the PPP and became a member of the Provincial Assembly of the Punjab in December 1970.

He later became a minister in the cabinet of the PPP-led provincial Government of Punjab, serving in various departments. In recent times, Rana Iqbal has been affiliated with the Pakistan Awami Tehreek, led by the religious scholar and academic Tahir-ul-Qadri. He is a member of the District Bar Association in Gujranwala and is now a senior advocate with the Supreme Court.

References

Date of birth unknown
Living people
Government Islamia College alumni
Punjab MPAs 1972–1977
Pakistan Awami Tehreek politicians
Pakistan People's Party politicians
Pakistani lawyers
People from Gujranwala
People from Patiala
Politicians from Punjab, Pakistan
Punjabi people
University of the Punjab alumni
Year of birth missing (living people)